Eustațiu Stoenescu (Craiova, 1884-New York City, 1957) was a Romanian painter principally known for his portraiture.
Eustatiu Stoenescu family originated from Oltenia in Romania. His father was a senator and his mother Mathilda was born in Brittany. Stoenescu met the French painter Leopold Durangel in 1889. He moved to Paris in 1900, with his friend Nicolas Titulescu. 
Stoenescu was, early on, inspired by the work of Jean-Paul Laurens with whom he studied. His first exhibition took place in 1905 at the Salon officiel de Paris  and the same year in Craiova. He was immediately successful and had the opportunity to meet prestigious artists such as Auguste Rodin, Antoine Bourdelle, Henri Harpignies and Charles Cottet. By 1930 he was  considered in French art circles to be the greatest living Romanian painter at the time.
He was great portraitist not only capable of showing physical resemblance of the model but also the psychological dimension. He went many times in Brittany where he painted landscapes especially in Loctudy. 
He was a friend of the sculptor Constantin Brâncuși, who made a (lost) portrait bust of Stoenescu's son Daniel Eustațiu Stoenescu (b. 1921-d.after 1970). Daniel went on to become a successful, Coty Award winning designer of inventive costume jewellery who, with Steven Brody, founded the Cadoro jewelry company in Manhattan.

His rests are in the "cimetière parisien d'Ivry", near Paris, in Ivry-sur-Seine.

References

External links

Further reading
 
 

1884 births
1957 deaths
People from Craiova
20th-century Romanian painters
Romanian expatriates in France